Borăscu may refer to the following places in Romania:

 Borăscu, a commune in Gorj County
 Borăscu (Jilț), a tributary of the Jilț in Gorj County
 Borăscu, a tributary of the Lăpușnicul Mic in Hunedoara County